This is a list of members of the Tasmanian House of Assembly, elected at the 1982 state election:

 Denison Democrat MHA Norm Sanders resigned in late 1982 to run for the Australian Senate at the 1983 federal election. Independent green candidate Bob Brown, then briefly jailed as a result of protests against the Franklin Dam, was elected as his replacement on 4 January 1983. This was an unprecedented event in Tasmanian politics, as recounts virtually always result in the election of a member of the same party. However, as Sanders was more well known for his environmentalist activism than his work with the Democrats, his preferences passed to fellow activist Brown ahead of the other Democrat candidates.
 Denison Liberal MHA Max Bingham resigned in early 1984. Carmel Holmes was elected as his replacement on 25 June.
 Denison Labor MHA John Devine resigned in early 1984. Bob Graham was elected as his replacement on 25 June.
 Bass Labor MHA Michael Barnard resigned in mid–1984. Peter Patmore was elected as his replacement on 10 August.
 In 1983, Denison Liberal MHA Gabriel Haros was convicted for attempted false pretences and struck off as a legal practitioner. Despite maintaining Premier Gray's support, in mid-November 1985, he failed to be endorsed for the seat by the Liberal Party and stood unsuccessfully as an independent at the 1986 election.

Members of Tasmanian parliaments by term
20th-century Australian politicians